Carrickfergus Learning Community (CLC) is a collaboration project between the three post-primary schools in Carrickfergus, Northern Ireland.  The project aims to increase the number of subjects available to sixth-form students in the area.

Schools Involved
All three post-primary schools in Carrickfergus are involved;
 Carrickfergus Academy
 Carrickfergus Grammar School
 Ulidia Integrated College

Subjects Available
The schools offer AS and A2, Applied GCEs and BTec qualifications.

At Carrickfergus College

AS/A2
 Religious Education
 Film Studies (Distance learning)

Applied GCE
 Health & Social Care (Single Award)
 ICT (Single Award)

At Carrickfergus Grammar School

AS/A2
 Accounting
 Biology
 Chemistry
 French language
 Geography
 Government and Politics
 Home Economics
 Music
 Photography
 Physics
 Technology

At Downshire School

AS/A2
 Media Studies

Applied GCE
 Travel & Tourism (Single Award)
 Physical Education (Single Award)

At Ulidia Integrated College

AS/A2
 Moving Image Arts
 Mathematics

BTec
 Performing Arts
 Sports Studies
 e.Business

Logistics
Pupils travel by taxi between the three schools involved, and sit exams in the school in which they are taught.

Criticisms
The CLC is often criticized by pupils in attendance of Carrickfergus Grammar School because of the negative effects produced by cross-school timetabling, reducing the flexibility of individual schools to alter their timetable to offer unusual subject combinations that prior to the CLC were possible, for example music and technology. The CLC also gives schools the opportunity to save money by dropping subjects they original taught and offering pupils the subject at other schools for example, Carrickfergus Grammar School no longer offers media-studies but instead offer the subject at Downshire Community School through the CLC, reducing costs but increasing strain on the timetable.

References

External links 
CLC information at Carrickfergus College
CLC information at Downshire School

Carrickfergus
Education in County Antrim